On My Skin may refer to:
 On My Skin (2003 film), an Italian crime-drama film
 On My Skin (2018 film), an Italian drama film